Thoko Ntshinga (born 1953), is a South African actress, director, translator, community theatre facilitator and arts activist. She is best known for the roles in the television serials such as; Egoli: Place of Gold, Interrogation Room and The River.

Personal life
Ntshinga was born in 1953 in Langa, Cape Town, South Africa to a musical family.

Career
Her acting career started in 1970s with theatre plays. When she was a single parent with a two year-old daughter, she made into an audition notice for the Space Theatre. In the stage, she performed in the critics acclaim play Fröken Julie where she won the a Fleur du Cap Theatre Award. At the Space Theatre, she performed in the plays such as; A Flea in her Ear, Four Twins, The Incredible Vanishing, Lysistrata S.A., Nongogo, Patty Hearst, Rape – A Revue and The Sacrifice of Kreli. Then she joined with Barney Simon at the Market Theatre and performed in the plays Cincinnati, Born in the RSA (1985), Panorama (1987/88) and Auditioning Angels.

In 1981, she made television debut with the series Westgate. Then in 1982, she reprised the role "Westgate receptionist" in Westgate II. In 1983, she made film debut with the direct-to-video film Farce About Uys. Since then, she appeared in many films such as; Skating on Thin Uys (as "Sophie"), A Place for Weeping (as "Joseph's Widow"), Born in the RSA, Act of Piracy (as "Cynthia") and in A Dry White Season (as "Emily"). In 1991, she joined with the original regular cast of the M-Net soap opera Egoli: Place of Gold where she played the role "Donna Makaula". Her role became highly popular, where she continued to play the role for thirteen consecutive seasons of the show until 2010.

In the meantime in 2005, she played the role of "Senior Superintendent Nomsa Dlamba" on the SABC1 drama series Interrogation Room. She reprised the role for the first four seasons of the show until 2008. In 2016, she made a minor role as "Female Driver" in the Universal TV miniseries Cape Town. Then in 2018, she appeared in two serials: as "Ma Mabatha" in the Mzansi Magic drama Nkululeko and then as "Nomhle" in the first two seasons of 1Magic telenovela The River. In latter, she reprised her role in the fourth season. In 2019, she joined with the kykNET supernatural police procedural series Die Spreeus to play the role "Thulani". In 2021, she played the role "Funeka Mdwaba" in the SABC2 telenovela Die Sentrum.

At the 2018 South African Film and Television Awards (SAFTAs), she was honored with The Golden Horn Award for Lifetime Achievement for her contribution to the South African drama. Apart from acting, she involved in the Inclusive Arts Programme at Artscape in Cape Town. Meanwhile, she founded the skills development project called Our organization, the Thoko Ntshinga Foundation, which has partnered with youth empowerment organizations such as "Africa Jam" and "Bavuse Balele" to uplift the young artists in rural Kirkwood in the Eastern Cape.

As a stage director, she directed the 2015 play revival Born in the RSA. Then in 2017, she produced the play Buzani Ku Bawo for Artscape. In the meantime, she served as the Director of Artscape’s Inclusive Arts Unit.

Filmography

References

External links
 IMDb

1953 births
Living people
South African film actresses
South African television actresses
South African stage actresses